Žemaitkiemis Manor is a former residential manor in Žemaitkiemis, Ukmergė District Municipality.

References

Manor houses in Lithuania
Classicism architecture in Lithuania